The People's Party was a short-lived political party in the state of Illinois, founded in 1873 in the interest of combating the temperance movement and alcohol prohibition in Chicago. 

The party was founded by German Americans Boss Hesing and Hermann Raster of the Illinois Staats-Zeitung, who temporarily split with the Republican Party due to its inaction with fighting anti-liquor laws. While the People's Party lasted only two years, it succeeded in electing Harvey Doolittle Colvin as Mayor of Chicago in 1873. The voting base of the People's Party primarily consisted of the German, Irish, Scandinavian, and Bohemian communities of Chicago.

See also 
 Illinois Staats-Zeitung
 Temperance movement

References

Centrist political parties in the United States
Defunct organizations based in Illinois
Defunct political parties in the United States
Political parties in Illinois
Political parties established in 1873
1873 establishments in Illinois
Political parties disestablished in 1875
1875 disestablishments in Illinois